McTiernan is a surname. Notable people with the surname include:

Edward McTiernan (1892–1990), Australian jurist, lawyer and politician
John McTiernan (born 1951), American film director and producer

See also
 McKiernan Clan
 McKernan (surname)
 McKiernan
 McTernan
 Kernan (disambiguation)
 Tiernan